Kadaň is a town in Chomutov District in the Ústí nad Labem Region of the Czech Republic. It has about 18,000 inhabitants. It lies on the banks of the river Ohře. Kadaň is a tourist centre with highlights being the Franciscan Monastery and the historical square with late Gothic Town Hall Tower. The town centre is well preserved and is protected by law as an urban monument reservation.

Administrative parts
Villages of Brodce, Kadaňská Jeseň, Meziříčí, Nová Víska, Pokutice, Prunéřov, Tušimice, Úhošťany and Zásada u Kadaně are administrative parts of Kadaň.

Geography

It lies on the border between the Most Basin and Doupov Mountains. The northern tip of the municipal territory extends into the Ore Mountains.

Kadaň is situated on the banks of the river Ohře. It was completed in 1972. Its main purpose is to ensure a minimum flow under the reservoir, but it also serves for the energy use and for recreation and water sports.

History

Early history until the 17th century
There are legends accrediting the beginnings of the town to Celtic tribes. In the 1st century A.D. Germanic tribes came, but moved on in the great Germanic migration to the west. In the 6th century the country was settled by Slavs. Some talk about a castle on Úhošť hill that might have been called Wogastisburg where a battle between Franks and Slavs occurred in 631. The battle of Canburg in 805 is also often mentioned in connection with the town, but is a mistake because locality of this name (Canburg – Kanina) is in Central Bohemia.

The first written record is, though, of the end of the 12th century – the Czech prince granted the "market town" of Kadaň to the Knights of St. John. Slavic rulers called German settlers into the country, offering them freedom but gaining taxes at the same time. The Knights Hospitaller built the first church in Kadaň, Church of Saint John the Baptist, which still stands in the part of town called Hospitaller Suburb, but is now in the Baroque style. In the 13th century, the town was promoted to a "Royal Town". It began to thrive and a new town was built on the heights above the river, with a castle and Kadaň Franciscan Monastery. There was a big fire in 1362. However, Emperor Charles IV who twice visited the town (1367 and 1374) granted it several municipal rights (home rule, a vineyard, and an annual market) that made it flourish again. The reign of Wenceslaus IV produced the skilled clockmaker Mikuláš of Kadaň, who, together with mathematician and astronomer Jan Šindel, designed the Prague Orloj.

The 15th century brought a new dimension to the history of Kadaň: the town and castle often used to be pledged to royal creditors. At the end of the rule of George of Poděbrady first the town and later the castle was captured by Jan Hasištejnský z Lobkovic, who seemed to see Kadaň as a suitable capital for his dependent territories. The establishment and construction of the monastery of the Franciscans of strict observance, built as a family burial-place and later a pardon place of the Fourteen Holy Helpers, may reflect his ambitions for the town. Jan Hasištejnský died in 1517 and is buried in the Church of the Fourteen Holy Helpers. His tomb is still on display in the Church, now part of the municipal museum. The same year saw the beginning of the Reformation in Germany, which had an immediate impact on the atmosphere in German speaking Kadaň. In 1534, "Kadaň religious peace" was negotiated here between Württemberg Protestants and Ferdinand I, Holy Roman Emperor for the Catholic side. In the Thirty Years' War during the next century, Kadaň suffered from fires and plundering by various armies on their way to the battlefields of Bohemia. After the war, the formerly Czech-German town became a monolingual German domain.

18th–19th centuries

During the Silesian Wars, Kadaň was a foothold for the withdrawing French army that fortified in the Franciscan monastery and was besieged by Hungarian and Croatian units of the Austrian army. The door of the monastery church still shows the bullet holes from that battle on 14 October 1742. The town caught fire in 1746, providing a great opportunity for Kadaň's "Christopher Wren" – Johann Christoph Kosch. He built many Baroque buildings, including the Church of the Elevation of the Holy Cross, the Church of the Holy Family and the monastery of the Order of St. Elisabeth. The Castle of Kadaň was rebuilt to serve as a barracks in the time of Maria Theresa of Austria. Her son Joseph II visited Kadaň in 1779. Joseph's reforms also affected town life. The monastery of Minorites was closed and thereafter became the premises of the first Grammar School under control of the Piarists from 1803 to 1823. 1788 saw the inauguration of the town municipal council. Jakob Marzel Sternberger was its first Mayor and held office until 1822. His great-grandson Jacob Sternberger emigrated to the United States in 1850 as part of the first wave of European immigrants of that time (Max Kade Institute).

The last great fire damaged the town in 1811 and since then, the historic centre has retained its pattern. After the Revolution of 1848 the letdown town became a district centre. The institute of the district town lasted in Kadaň for 110 years when it was affiliated with Chomutov District. In the second half of the 19th century homeland study activities developed and a number of institutions, clubs and societies were established. The national composition of the Kadaň population was very explicit – over 90% German and only 3% Czech, with a Jewish community as well.

20th century
After Czechoslovakia was established on 28 October 1918, most of the German border population was not enthusiastic about becoming part of a new republic with a clearly Slavonic definition. Instead, four regional self-governed states emerged along the borderland, Kadaň declared itself part of German Bohemia. On 4 March 1919, the first assembly of the Austria parliament. This was the occasion for both peaceful and violent demonstrations in the mostly German-populated border cities. In Kadaň, the curfew and martial law was declared and the Czechoslovak military forces were sent in. The demonstration in Kadaň for self determination was the bloodiest. According to Swiss Neue Zürcher Zeitung report of 7 March 1919, 17 persons were killed, 30 badly wounded, and 80 wounded there. Over all, 25 victims were buried in a memorial grave at the central cemetery. It was restored after the fall of communism in 1989.

After the Munich Agreement in later September 1938, Kaaden became part of Reichsgau Sudetenland. The local Czech people were forced to move to central Czechoslovakia, the remaining ones and the Jewish community was strongly oppressed. The synagogue was burnt down during the Kristallnacht of 9 November 1939. According to Beneš decrees, after the World War II, the German population was expelled, and the area was re-settled by Czech people, many without roots in this region.

From the 1950s, new prefabricated housing estates were built that reached the outer parts of the historical conurbation in the 1960s and 70s. This expansion was necessary because many people had moved in to get jobs in the region's thriving mining and electrical industries. The historical monuments were dilapidated and uncared-for. Before 1989 some parts of the historical centre were intended to be replaced by modern housing. Fortunately the Velvet Revolution changed the trend of development in the town and brought about a change in attitudes towards the cultural values of the past. The historical heart of Kadaň began to be repaired and after 15 years it has become a pearl of the region. There is now a new site on the bank of the Ohře being planned and projected – Maxipes Fík Embankment with many attractions both for children and adults. The town has been turning to be a tourist centre of the predominantly industrial region. The only drawback for tourism is the lack of a higher-capacity hotel in the town.

Demographics

Economy
Although it is situated in an industrial part of the Czech Republic, there is no major industry within the town and people usually work in offices or have to commute. There are two large power plants in the outskirts of the town, Tušimice Power Station and Prunéřov Power Station.

Culture

Annual events held in the town include:
 Emperor's Day
 Maxipes Fík Birthday
 Kirwitzer Astronomical Day
 Old Czech Carnival
 Franciscan Summer
 Vine Harvest Festival
 Vysmáté léto – Summer Music Fest
 Nativity Play
 Passion of Christ Play

Religion
There are churches and chapels of four Christian denominations: Roman Catholic Church, Czechoslovak Hussite Church, Evangelical Church of Czech Brethren and Eastern Orthodox Church. Roman Catholic parish Church of the Exaltation of the Holy Cross is situated in the square.

Education

Kadaň is home to several secondary schools with a long history. The oldest of them is the Gymnasium Kadaň that was established in 1803 with 99 students and continued under the control of the Piarists until 1823. The seat of the old gymnasium was a former Minorites Monastery (different from the Franciscan Monastery) near the square in a building which is now residence of the Regional Archives. The institute of gymnasium was then reestablished in 1872 in a new building. The gymnasium was closed again in 1951 and the new Industrial School moved to the building. It is still there today. A new gymnasium was established in 1968 and has remained on the same premises since 1978.

The Industrial School specialized at first on mining (because of the lignite and uranium mines in the surroundings), however since 1957 it has been specialized on building and finally in 2001 it added Commercial Academy to its educational program so now it is called Industrial Building School and Commercial Academy.

The Agriculture School (now SOŠS a SOU Amos) was established in 1862 as so-called Ackerbauschule. In front of the building there are valuable statues of Albrecht Thaer and Justus von Liebig (restored in 2003).

The teaching in all the schools was in German language until 1945.

There are four elementary schools in Kadaň and a school for handicapped children.

Sport
The town is home to an ice hockey club SK Kadaň, which plays in the 1st Czech Republic Hockey League (2nd tier).

Sights

The Franciscan Monastery in Kadaň was founded in the 15th century. It is a national cultural monument with unique murals and rare cellar vault. It also includes gardens with a vineyard. Due to the uniqueness of world importance, an application was submitted for its inclusion in the list of UNESCO World Heritage Sites. The monastery complex is a centre of cultural events and also serves as a museum.

Kadaň Castle is a core of the preserved town fortifications, which surrounds the entire historic centre of the town. It was an early Gothic castle founded around 1260, rebuilt into late Gothic and Renaissance styles in the 16th century. It contains an exposition about its history. Another part of the fortification is the barbican of the original Žatec Gate, one of the four main town gates. It was built in 1458 and is one of the oldest defensive structures of its kind in Central Europe.

Mírové Square and its surrounding form the historical centre. The town hall was built in the 14th century and still serves its original purpose. One of the most know landmarks and symbols of the town is the Town Hall Tower. It is open to the public as a lookout tower. The square also include the Church of the Exaltation of the Holy Cross, the Holy Trinity column, or a baroque fountain, which is called Šlikovský pond due to its size.

From the square leads the narrowest lane in the Czech Republic, Katova ulička (meaning "Hangman's alley").

In literature
Benjamin Constant set a part of his famous novel Adolphe (1816) in Kadaň, referring to it as Caden, petite ville de la Bohême.

Notable people

Peter Nigri (1434–1481 or 1484), theologian
Jan Hasištejnský z Lobkovic (1450–1517), traveller, diplomat and writer
Wenceslas Pantaleon Kirwitzer (1588–1626), astronomer
Anton Graf von Wolkenstein-Trostburg (1832–1913), Austro-Hungarian diplomat
Theodor Innitzer (1875–1955), cardinal, Archbishop of Vienna
Edward Goll (1884–1949), pianist and music teacher
Hans Zeisel (1905–1992), German-American sociologist
Karel Havlíček (1907–1988), painter
Josef Dvořák (born 1942), actor
Petr Klíma (born 1964), ice hockey player
Ondřej Kaše (born 1995), ice hockey player
Dominik Feri (born 1996), politician
Aneta Lédlová (born 1996), ice hockey player

Twin towns – sister cities

Kadaň is twinned with:
 Aue-Bad Schlema, Germany
 Halle, Belgium
 Vara, Sweden

References

External links

Official tourist portal

 
Populated places in Chomutov District
Cities and towns in the Czech Republic